Presidential elections were held in Chile on 5 April 1831. Carried out through a system of electors, they resulted in the election of General Joaquín Prieto as president.

Background
Following the victory by the conservatives at the Battle of Lircay, which put an end to the Chilean Civil War of 1829–30, order was restored. A new Congress was elected, and a call for presidential elections was made. A restricted number of citizens voted for electors, who in turn voted to elect a new president.

On June 2, the day following the first session of the new Congress, the vote recount took place. Joaquín Prieto was elected President, and Diego Portales Vice President. The position of Vice President was later abolished with the Constitution of 1833.

Results

References

Presidential elections in Chile
Chile
1831 in Chile
March 1831 events
Election and referendum articles with incomplete results